Daxu is a town in Lingchuan County, Guilin, Guangxi Province, China. , it administers one residential community and the following 17 villages:
Daxu Village
Ganxing Village
Han Village
Liaojia Village
Zhujia Village
Lijia Village
Gaoqiao Village
Shangqiao Village
Xiong Village
Xiazhang Village
Nanji Village
Xima Village
Jiansha Village
Yuanjia Village
Qin'an Village
Fuli Village
Maozhou Village

References

Lingchuan County, Guangxi
Towns of Guilin